Gift Selaelo Morukhuladi (born 11 November 1994),  professionally known as Mvzzle is a South African DJ, singer-songwriter, and producer. He is famous for producing the single "Umlilo" by DJ Zinhle.

Personal life 
Born Gift S. Morukhuladi, in Musina and raised in a village called Mountain View. His mother is a businesswoman and his father was the Conductor of the military band. At age 8, he moved to Polokwane International Gateway to be with his parents. At this point, his dad had gone from Conductor to Band Master at the SA Army Band.

Early life

2014–2015 
Before producing House music, Mvzzle was a full time Hip Hop producer and rapper in high school. He was with a musical trio called Cyclops alongside his teammates Septic Rooger (Kagiso Mokwena) and Gran-T (Thabiso Ledwaba), which Mvzzle produced his first singles and mixtape with. After the trio disbanded, Mvzzle started his solo career producing both house and rap music, releasing singles titled Carpe Diem and Thick Madam, which he entered the SABC1's 1s and 2s competition with.

2016 
Initially producing Hip-Hop and R&B, he started producing house music in 2016. He dropped out of college to pursue music and the assistance of South African Arts and Culture Youth Forum who gave him opportunities to play at events such as Major League Gardens, Mapungubwe Arts Festival, and Motsepe Foundation.

2018 
He entered SABC 1's Dj competition, 1's and 2's – where he placed third. After the competition, MVZZLE contacted DJ Zinhle with two beats, one of which is now the song "Umlilo" featuring Rethabile – who had earlier been in contact with DJ Zinhle on Instagram proposing a collaboration with her.

Career 
DJ Zinhle's Umlilo has been certified multi-platinum and within its first three months, it reached over 5.1 million streams.

In celebration of the song's success, DJ Zinhle released a second video for Umlilo in December.

The hit single went on to receive triple-platinum plaques, and multiple SAMAs nominations. The single won a NAMA award. The female producer DJ Zinhle was accused of buying nominations for the song.

Discography

Singles and EPs

Filmography

Television

Awards and nominations

References

External links 
 

1995 births
Living people
People from Limpopo
South African record producers
Sotho people
House musicians
Amapiano musicians 
South African songwriters
21st-century South African singers